Union Sportive du Yatenga is a Burkinabé football club based in Ouahigouya in the north of the country.
The club was formed after a fusion between Stade Yatenga and a smaller club and since 2005 it plays in the Burkinabé Premier League.

References

Yatenga
Sport in Ouagadougou